The Polish Academy Award for Discovery of the Year has been awarded annually since 2008 by the Polish Film Academy. Award is given to the debutantes of Polish cinema, who are candidates to the Polish Academy Award for first time.

Winners and nominees

2000s

2010s

2020s

References

External links 
 http://www.pnf.pl

Polish film awards
Awards established in 2008